Dimarini is an antlion tribe in the family Myrmeleontidae.

References

External links 

Myrmeleontidae
Insect tribes